Live 2002 may refer to:

 Live 2002 (Lara Fabian album)
 Live 2002 (Comes with the Fall album)